Clifford Paul "Cliff" Carr (born 19 July 1964) was a footballer who played in The Football League for Chesterfield, Fulham, Mansfield Town, Shrewsbury Town and Stoke City.

Career
Carr was born in Hackney and started his career at Fulham's youth team and broke into the first team at Craven Cottage in 1982. He went on to be captain for the "Cottagers" and made over 150 first team games for the West London club and earned an England U21 cap in 1985. Fulham were relegated to the third tier in 1985–86 and after almost slipping to a second consecutive relegation Carr joined Stoke City for a fee of £45,000 in August 1987. He had a poor start to his Stoke career under Mick Mills and there was much speculation that he be quickly leaving but he improved in his performances and claimed the left back position and became a popular player with the Victoria Ground support. He played 50 times in 1987–88 and 46 times in 1988–89 during which time he scored his only goal for the "Potters" which came in a 4–0 win over Hull City on 13 November 1988. Injury prevented from playing in the first three months of the 1989–90 as Stoke ended up being relegated to the Third Division. The 1990–91 was an awful one for Stoke as they finished in their lowest ever league position, Carr making 22 appearances. In total he made 143 appearances for Stoke scoring once before being released by new manager Lou Macari.

After a brief spell at non-league Shrewsbury Town where he scored twice in two matches for the "Shrews" he played for non-league Telford United before joining Mansfield Town. He played 22 matches for the "Stags" in the 1991–92 helping them gain promotion to the Third Division and then joined their local rivals Chesterfield. Carr spent two seasons at Saltergate making 82 appearances scoring once. He then returned to Telford United where he ended his career.

Career statistics
Source:

A.  The "Other" column constitutes appearances and goals in the Full Members Cup and Football League Trophy.

References

External links
 

English footballers
England under-21 international footballers
Stoke City F.C. players
Telford United F.C. players
Chesterfield F.C. players
Mansfield Town F.C. players
Shrewsbury Town F.C. players
Fulham F.C. players
English Football League players
1964 births
Living people
Association football defenders